Owyhee County is a county in the southwestern corner of the U.S. state of Idaho. As of the 2020 census, the population was 12,133. The county seat is Murphy, and its largest city is Homedale. In area it is the second-largest county in Idaho, behind Idaho County.

Owyhee County is part of the Boise metropolitan area and contains slightly more than half of the Duck Valley Indian Reservation, which extends over the Nevada border, into Elko County. The majority of the federally recognized Shoshone-Paiute Tribe that is associated with this reservation lives on the Nevada side; its tribal center is in Owyhee, Nevada.

History
This area was the territory of Western Shoshone, Northern Paiute, and Bannock peoples and their ancestors for thousands of years prior to the arrival of Americans. Conflicts over land use and resources led to the indigenous peoples being pushed aside.

On December 31, 1863, Owyhee County became the first county organized by the Idaho Territory Legislature. While Boise, Idaho, Nez Perce, and Shoshone counties were organized under the laws of Washington Territory, they were not recognized by the Idaho Territory until February 1864. The original county seat at Ruby City was moved to nearby Silver City in 1867.

Owyhee County's original boundary was the portion of Idaho Territory south of the Snake River and west of the Rocky Mountains. Less than a month after the creation of Owyhee County, Oneida County was formed in January 1864 from the eastern portion of the county. The formation of Cassia County in 1879 took further territory in the east.

Owyhee County's history is closely linked to the mining boom that dominated Idaho Territory in the second half of the 19th century. Silver City and Ruby City developed as boom towns. At its height in the 1880s, Owyhee County was among the most populous places in Idaho. Today it is among the least populous, at 1.4 persons per square mile (0.5 per km2).

Because of pressure from miners and settlers, the federal government made a treaty in 1877 with the Western Shoshone to cede land, and established what is now known as the Duck Valley Indian Reservation in this county and across the border in Elko County, Nevada. The reservation was expanded in 1886 to accommodate people of the Northern Paiute. In the 20th century, the tribes combined and are federally recognized as a single government; the majority of the people live on the Nevada side of the reservation.

There were two railroad lines extending into Owyhee County, the first was the Boise Nampa & Owyhee Railroad which built starting in 1896 from Nampa, Idaho south towards Melba, Idaho and eventually across the Snake River into Owyhee County in 1897, whereupon it crossed Rabbit Creek before arriving in Murphy, Idaho. The first train into Murphy occurred in 1899.
The Boise, Nampa & Owyhee Railroad was acquired by the Idaho Northern Railroad in 1907; the line was taken over by the Oregon Short Line Railroad in 1913 following their purchase of the Idaho Northern Railroad, after which it became known as the Murphy Branch line. 
Daily passenger service to Murphy was discontinued in 1942. By 1947, shipping animals out of Murphy was no longer profitable for the railroad. The Murphy portion of the line was abandoned in 1947.  In the 1950s, trucks and highways became the dominant mode of transportation. The last train left Melba in 1994, and all rails were torn out in that same year.  

The second railroad line was the Oregon Shortline Railroad which built south from Nyssa oregon beginning in 1911, passing through Adrian oregon the line ended after 25 miles in Homedale idaho, in 1922 it was extended Marsing idaho to accommodate additional agricultural traffic.
In 1970 the marsing and homedale depots were closed by union pacific, in 1987 with declining carload the UP offered the line for sale but no buyers were found.
Following the closure of lumber mill in Homedale in the early 1990s the Homedale branch, now reduced to the status of an "industrial lead" generated a total of 49 carloads in 1995 and 42 in 1996. In 1997 Union Pacific filed for permission to abandon the Idaho portion of the line and received no formal protest, the tracks were ripped up the following year.

Owyhee County gained its present boundaries in 1930 after an election approved moving a portion of it near Glenns Ferry and King Hill to neighboring Elmore County. In 1934 the county seat was moved from the nearly abandoned Silver City to its present location in Murphy. In the 21st century, both Silver City and Ruby City are ghost towns, remnant of the mining boom.

Etymology
The name "Owyhee" derives from an early anglicization of the Hawaiian term "Hawaiʻi." When James Cook encountered what he named the Sandwich Islands (now the Hawaiian Islands) in 1778, he found them inhabited by Native Hawaiians, whom the Anglo-Americans referred to as "Owyhees." Noted for their hardy physique and maritime skills, numerous Native Hawaiians were hired as crew members aboard European and American vessels. Many Owyhee sailed to the American Northwest coast and found employment along the Columbia River, where they joined trapping expeditions or worked at some of the fur trade posts.

In 1819, three Owyhee joined Donald Mackenzie's Snake expedition, which went out annually into the Snake country for the North West Company, a Montreal-based organization of Canadian fur traders. The three Hawaiians left the main party during the winter of 1819–20 to explore the then unknown terrain of what since has been called the Owyhee River and mountains. They disappeared and were presumed dead; no further information regarding their whereabouts has been found. In memory of these Native Hawaiians, British fur trappers started to call the region "Owyhee" and the name stuck.

Geography
It is the second-largest county in Idaho by area.

Nearly all of the county is high intermountain desert, with plentiful sagebrush and basalt canyons. The lowest elevation is at the county's northwest corner, where the Snake River is just above  at the Oregon border. The Snake forms most of the county's northern border from Oregon to just west of Glenns Ferry in Elmore County. A tributary of the Snake is the Bruneau River, which flows north from Nevada through the eastern section of the county. The Owyhee River starts in the southwestern part of the county and flows westward into Oregon; it eventually enters the Snake at the state border, south of Nyssa.

Adjacent counties
 Canyon County – north
 Ada County – north
 Elmore County – north
 Twin Falls County – east
 Elko County, Nevada – south/Pacific Time Border
 Humboldt County, Nevada – southwest/Pacific Time Border
 Malheur County, Oregon – west

National protected areas
 Big Jacks Creek Wilderness
 Bruneau - Jarbidge Rivers Wilderness
 Deer Flat National Wildlife Refuge (part)
 Little Jacks Creek Wilderness
 North Fork Owyhee Wilderness
 Owyhee River Wilderness
 Pole Creek Wilderness
 Snake River Birds of Prey National Conservation Area (part)

Demographics

2000 census
As of the census of 2000, there were 10,644 people, 3,710 households, and 2,756 families living in the county. The population density was 1.4 person per square mile (0.5/km2). There were 4,452 housing units at an average density of 1 per square mile (0/km2). The racial makeup of the county was 76.87% White, 0.15% Black or African American, 3.21% Native American, 0.47% Asian, 0.08% Pacific Islander, 16.50% from other races, and 2.72% from two or more races. 23.10% of the population were Hispanic or Latino of any race. 14.3% were of American, 12.5% German, 10.4% English and 8.1% Irish ancestry.

There were 3,710 households, out of which 37.80% had children under the age of 18 living with them, 61.20% were married couples living together, 8.70% had a female householder with no husband present, and 25.70% were non-families. 21.80% of all households were made up of individuals, and 9.50% had someone living alone who was 65 years of age or older. The average household size was 2.85 and the average family size was 3.35.

In the county, the population was spread out, with 31.90% under the age of 18, 8.50% from 18 to 24, 26.50% from 25 to 44, 20.90% from 45 to 64, and 12.10% who were 65 years of age or older. The median age was 33 years. For every 100 females, there were 109.00 males. For every 100 females age 18 and over, there were 107.60 males.

The median income for a household in the county was $28,339, and the median income for a family was $32,856. Males had a median income of $25,146 versus $20,718 for females. The per capita income for the county was $13,405. About 14.20% of families and 16.90% of the population were below the poverty line, including 20.80% of those under age 18 and 12.10% of those age 65 or over.

2010 census
As of the 2010 United States Census, there were 11,526 people, 4,076 households, and 2,954 families living in the county. The racial makeup of the county was 76.0% white, 4.3% American Indian, 0.5% Asian, 0.2% black or African American, 16.6% from other races, and 2.4% from two or more races. Those of Hispanic or Latino origin made up 25.8% of the population. In terms of ancestry, 19.6% were American, 13.8% were German, 9.5% were English, and 9.4% were Irish.

Of the 4,076 households, 36.9% had children under the age of 18 living with them, 57.3% were married couples living together, 9.6% had a female householder with no husband present, 27.5% were non-families, and 23.0% of all households were made up of individuals. The average household size was 2.79 and the average family size was 3.29. The median age was 36.0 years.

The median income for a household in the county was $33,441 and the median income for a family was $36,405. Males had a median income of $31,404 versus $29,167 for females. The per capita income for the county was $17,373. About 18.0% of families and 22.2% of the population were below the poverty line, including 33.9% of those under age 18 and 10.8% of those age 65 or over.

Media
 The Owyhee Avalanche County newspaper

Communities

Cities
 Grand View
 Homedale
 Marsing

Census-designated places

Bruneau

 Murphy

Unincorporated communities
 Claytonia
 Murphy Hot Springs
 Oreana
 Reynolds
 Riddle

Ghost towns
 De Lamar
 Dewey
 Grasmere
 Ruby City
 Silver City
 Wickahoney

Politics
Although Owyhee County was amongst the most Democratic in the state in its early history, it has like most of Idaho gradually turned overwhelmingly Republican. In no presidential election since 1940 has the county selected the Democratic candidate, and no Democrat since Jimmy Carter in 1976 has won more than one-third of the county's vote.

Gallery

See also
National Register of Historic Places listings in Owyhee County, Idaho
List of counties in Idaho

References

Further reading
 A historical, descriptive and commercial directory of Owyhee County, Idaho, January 1898 (1898)

External links
 Owyhee County website
 Owyhee County Parcel Maps
 National Register of Historic Places for Owyhee County
 Owyhee County Historical Society
 County newspaper: The Owyhee Avalanche
 

 
Idaho counties
Idaho placenames of Native American origin
Populated places established in 1863
Boise metropolitan area
1863 establishments in Idaho Territory